The Plaxton Paragon and Plaxton Panther are closely related designs of coach bodywork built by Plaxton in Scarborough, North Yorkshire, England, since 1999, and still in production as of 2013.

For part of their design life, Plaxton was part of TransBus International, during which time the designs were officially referred to as the TransBus Paragon and TransBus Panther.

The Paragon and Panther replaced the Premiere and Excalibur respectively, with the Paragon being the standard and the Panther the premium specification coach. Externally, the main distinguishing feature between the two models is the front end, which is more upright on the Paragon, although the difference is not as pronounced as that between the Premiere and Excalibur.

One important new feature of the designs was the use of a stainless steel structure, to resist corrosion and prolong vehicle life expectancy.

The Generation 2 Panther was launched at Euro Bus Expo at Birmingham in November 2010. It shares some of the external design with the Plaxton Elite and will comply with the new European WVTA requirements as well as the older domestic Certificate of initial fitness (COIF) standards. New 12.8m version will be available on Volvo B9R with 53 seats. The Generation 2 15m Panther will be built on the Volvo B13RT for Megabus with 65 seats and the latest PLS lift. Production of the Paragon ceased afterwards.

The Panther Cub is a short wheelbase version launched in 2012.

The Generation 3 Panther launched in September 2013 and is a more substantial facelift with a similar rear to the Elite and new headlights similar to the Elite Interdeck.

Body numbering
From the 1989 build season up until the 2010 build season, Plaxton's body numbering system used a letter to identify the body style. The following letters are used for the Paragon and Panther:

L   Panther
T   Paragon

Since the 2011 build season, in which the body numbering format was changed to match that of parent company Alexander Dennis, the Panther is now assigned the identifier letter P.

Gallery

Plaxton Panther

Plaxton Paragon

References

External links

Paragon
Vehicles introduced in 1999
Coaches (bus)
Single-deck buses